Samuel Frankel Mayer (February 28, 1893 – July 1, 1962) was an outfielder in Major League Baseball. He played for the Washington Senators. He was Jewish.

References

External links

1893 births
1962 deaths
Major League Baseball outfielders
Washington Senators (1901–1960) players
Baseball players from Atlanta
Blytheville (minor league baseball) players
Fulton Colonets players
Savannah Indians players
Savannah Colts players
Kansas City Blues (baseball) players
Topeka Jayhawks players
Atlanta Crackers players
Louisville Colonels (minor league) players
Little Rock Travelers players
San Antonio Bears players
New Haven Profs players
Pittsfield Hillies players
Jewish American baseball players
Jewish Major League Baseball players
20th-century American Jews